Mariano Graziadei also known as Mariano da Pescia, was an Italian painter of the early-Renaissance period, active in Florence. He was born in Pescia, and trained under Ridolfo Ghirlandaio. He painted a Holy Family for the chapel of the Signoria in the Palazzo Vecchio of Florence.

References

Year of birth unknown
Year of death unknown
16th-century Italian painters
Italian male painters
Painters from Tuscany
Italian Renaissance painters